Porthecla dinus is a butterfly in the family Lycaenidae. It is found in fragmented montane habitats at altitudes between 600 and 1,800 meters in south-eastern Brazil.

The length of the forewings is 16.7 mm for males and 15.6 mm for females. Adults are on wing from September to April.

References

Butterflies described in 1867
Eumaeini
Lycaenidae of South America
Taxa named by William Chapman Hewitson